Pinguicula antarctica is a species of carnivorous plant from the genus Pinguicula, family Lentibulariaceae, described by Vahl.

References

antarctica
Plants described in 1827